North East Assembly (NEA) was the regional chamber for the North East region of England, based in Gateshead. It was abolished in March 2009 with its functions being transferred to One NorthEast, the Regional Development Agency, and the Association of North East Councils, the Local Authority Leaders’ Board.

References

Regional assemblies in England
Local government in North East England
2009 disestablishments in England